Anders Danielsen Lie (born 1 January 1979) is a Norwegian actor, musician and medical doctor.

Education
Danielsen Lie studied Ancient Greek (1997-1998), musicology (2001-2003) and medicine (1999-2007) at the University of Oslo.

Career

Acting career
Danielsen Lie made his film debut when he was 11 years old in the title role of Herman (1990) by Erik Gustavson. He is best known for his longtime collaboration with director Joachim Trier., with leading roles in his films Reprise (2006), Oslo, August 31st (2011) and The Worst Person in the World (2021), also known as the Oslo Trilogy.  Oslo, August 31st was selected for Un Certain Regard at the 2011 Cannes Film Festival. The Guardian critic Peter Bradshaw included Danielsen Lie on his top ten list of the best male performances of 2011. In 2016 he starred alongside Kristen Stewart in Olivier Assayas' supernatural psychological thriller film Personal Shopper, which was selected for main competition at the 69th Cannes film festival. Danielsen Lie is known for playing emotionally complex, sometimes mentally disturbed, characters. In 2018 he portrayed the perpetrator of the 2011 Norway attacks in Paul Greengrass' docudrama 22 July. Danielsen Lie has played Norwegian, English and French-speaking roles. He performed two different versions of his role in The Night Eats the World, one in English and one in French. In 2017 he made his stage acting debut in the role of obituary writer Daniel Woolf in Patrick Marber's play Closer (1997).

Danielsen Lie played major roles in the 2021 films The Worst Person in the World by Joachim Trier, and Bergman Island by Mia Hansen-Løve. Both films were selected for main competition at the 74th Cannes Film Festival 2021. For his part in The Worst Person in the World he received the National Society of Film Critics Award for Best Supporting Actor 2022, and the performance was named one of the 10 best movie performances of 2021 by Time magazine. The film was also declared the best film of 2021 by Vanity Fair and The Atlantic.
In June 2022 it was announced that he is working with Jessica Chastain, Anne Hathaway and Josh Charles on Mothers' Instinct, a psychological thriller directed by Benoit Delhomme. Other upcoming projects include Handling The Undead by director Thea Hvistendahl, alongside Renate Reinsve, and a biopic about Vidkun Quisling, the Nazi collaborator who ruled Norway during World War II. In March 2023 it was announced that he is set to work with Glenn Close on director Charlie McDowell's film adaptation of Tove Jansson's novel The Summer Book. 

On 11 April 2011 Danielsen Lie released This Is Autism, a concept album with music written, performed and produced by himself, loosely based on recordings from his childhood.

Medical career
Anders Danielsen Lie is a medical doctor and in-between movies maintains his practice working as a general practitioner with patients in Oslo. While promoting Bergman Island, he insisted "It doesn't really work and I would never recommend that anybody else combine the two". However, he has continued to maintain both a successful acting career and his medical practice since graduating from medical school. After shooting The Worst Person in the World in the fall of 2020, he started working as a medical supervisor for the COVID-19 vaccination center and contact trace team in the Nordre Aker borough of Oslo.

In 2007 Danielsen Lie and psychologist Maria Øverås authored a Norwegian language non-fiction sexual education book for young adults (Sex og sånt, Gyldendal). The book received an award from the Royal Ministry of Culture and Equality for best non-fiction and was also nominated for the Brage Prize, one of Norway's most prestigious literary awards. He has also written extensively on public health-related topics for Norwegian newspapers and magazines.

Personal life
Danielsen Lie is the son of Amanda Award-winning actor Tone Danielsen. He met Norwegian model Iselin Steiro in 2007, and they married on 5 July 2008. They have two daughters together.

Selected filmography

Awards and nominations

References

External links 

Living people
1979 births
Physicians from Oslo
Musicians from Oslo
21st-century Norwegian physicians
University of Oslo alumni
Norwegian male child actors
Norwegian male film actors
21st-century Norwegian male actors